The Hamsters (1993) (known informally as “The Black Album”) was The Hamsters third CD release. It was a studio album utilising more production techniques than previous releases. This was also the first Hamsters album to use additional session musicians.

Track listing
 "(I Wanna) Make Love To You" – 5:02
 "Georgia Slop" – 2:49
 "Climbing The Corporate Ladder" – 4:37
 "In The Heat Of The Night" – 5:57
 "The Guitar Bug" – 3:40
 "I Wouldn't Treat A Dog" – 4:04
 "Blues For The Blues" – 5:24
 "Heart Of Darkness" – 5:27
 "Black Monday (All Over Again)" – 3:37
 "Little Fine And Healthy Thing" – 4:32
 "Chevrolet" – 3:11
 "Sittin' On The Boat Dock" – 3:55
 "You'll Come Running Back To Me" – 6:23
 "Check From The Neck Up" – 4:24

Musicians
Snail's-Pace Slim —- guitars, lead vocals.
Rev Otis Elevator —- drums, vocals.
Ms Zsa Zsa Poltergeist —- bass, vocals.

Guest musicians
 Ian Gibbons —- keyboards.
 Chris Taylor —- keyboards.
 Rob Willis —- keyboards.
 Cate Shanks —-  additional backing vocals.

Production
 Recorded and mixed by Richard Willis
 Produced by Snail's-Pace Slim & Richard Willis
 Recorded at Bowling Green Studios, Netherton, Dudley, West Midlands, UK.
 Cover design by Phil Smee of Waldo's Design Emporium.

1990 albums
The Hamsters albums